American country music artist Lari White released five studio albums, one soundtrack album, one compilation album, two extended plays, and 15 singles.

Her first single release, "Flying Above the Rain", did not chart upon its 1988 release through Capitol Records. In 1993, she entered the Billboard Hot Country Songs charts for the first time with "What a Woman Wants", the debut single from her RCA Records Nashville album Lead Me Not. This album's follow-up, Wishes, charted three top-ten hits: "That's My Baby", "Now I Know", and "That's How You Know (When You're in Love)". White recorded Don't Fence Me In and a compilation titled The Best of Lari White before leaving RCA in 1997, followed by Stepping Stone for the former Lyric Street Records in 1998. All of her subsequent releases were through her own label, Skinny White Girl.

Albums

Extended plays

Singles

As a featured artist

Other album appearances

Music videos

Notes

References

Country music discographies
Discographies of American artists